Richard Arnold (born 1 July 1990) is an Australian professional rugby union player. He plays for Stade Toulousain in the French Top 14 competition. His regular position is lock.

Family and early life
Richie Arnold and his identical twin Rory were born in Wagga Wagga, Australia. Their father Tony was stationed there while in the army. The brothers were raised in Murwillumbah in northern New South Wales where they both played junior rugby league until aged 16.

Rugby career
Richie Arnold followed the path of his brother Rory, joining the Murwillumbah rugby club. He moved to the Gold Coast two years after his brother to play Premier Rugby at the Bond University Rugby Club in 2015. Arnold then signed with the Western Force squad, but injury and rehabilitation following a shoulder reconstruction preventing him from playing in the 2016 season. Arnold moved to French Top 14 side Stade Toulousain in early 2019.

Super Rugby statistics

References

External links
 Stats on It's Rugby

Australian rugby union players
Living people
1990 births
Queensland Country (NRC team) players
Rugby union locks
Western Force players
Rugby union players from Wagga Wagga
Identical twins
Australian expatriate sportspeople in France
Expatriate rugby union players in France
Australian expatriate rugby union players
Stade Toulousain players
Twin sportspeople
Australian twins
Rugby union players from New South Wales